Sarchahan (also Romanized as Sarchāhān) is a village in Tarom Rural District, in the Central District of Hajjiabad County, Hormozgan Province, Iran. At the 2006 census, its population was 2,255, in 514 families.

References 

Populated places in Hajjiabad County